The Deudorigini are a tribe of butterflies in the family Lycaenidae.

Genera

As not all Theclinae have been assigned to tribes, the following list of genera is preliminary:

 Araotes
 Artipe
 Bindahara
 Capys
 Deudorix (including Actis, Hypokopelates, Virachola)
 Hypomyrina
 Paradeudorix
 Pilodeudorix (including Diopetes)
 Qinorapala
 Rapala
 Sinthusa
 Sithon

References 

 
Butterfly tribes